Isera (Iséra in local dialect) is a comune (municipality) in Trentino in the northern Italian region Trentino-Alto Adige/Südtirol, located about  southwest of Trento.

The municipality of Isera contains the frazioni (subdivisions, mainly villages and hamlets) Marano, Cornalé, Reviano, Folaso, Patone, Lenzima and Bordala.

Isera borders the following municipalities: Villa Lagarina, Ronzo-Chienis, Rovereto, Nogaredo and Mori.

Demographic evolution

References

External links
 Homepage of the city

Cities and towns in Trentino-Alto Adige/Südtirol